Chris Randall (born 17 December 1995) is an Australian professional rugby league footballer who plays as a  for the Gold Coast Titans in the NRL.

He previously played for the Newcastle Knights.

Background
Born in Newcastle, New South Wales, Randall played his junior rugby league for Lakes United, progressing on to the first-grade side in the Newcastle Rugby League competition.

Playing career

Early years
Randall played his rugby league for Lakes United up until 2018, with some games for the Newcastle Knights' Canterbury Cup NSW team during the 2018 season. In 2019, he became a regular for the Knights' Canterbury Cup NSW side and earned a development contract for the NRL squad.

2020
In round 3 of the 2020 NRL season, Randall made his NRL debut for the Newcastle Knights against the Penrith Panthers. Due to an injury to halfback Mitchell Pearce, Randall came onto the field within the first 10 minutes and played the majority of the game. He set a new record for amount of tackles made by a player making their debut, with 71 tackles as the Newcastle club drew 14-14 all with Penrith.

2021
Randall only made five appearances for Newcastle in the 2021 NRL season. He did not play in the clubs elimination final loss against Parramatta.

2022
Randall played 17 games for Newcastle in the 2022 NRL season as the club missed the finals finishing 14th on the table.

In November, Randall was released from his Newcastle contract and signed a new two-year contact with the Gold Coast Titans starting in 2023, in a player swap with Greg Marzhew.

References

External links
Gold Coast Titans profile

1995 births
Living people
Australian rugby league players
Newcastle Knights players
Gold Coast Titans players
Lakes United Seagulls players
Rugby league hookers
Rugby league five-eighths
Rugby league players from Newcastle, New South Wales